A metaconstitution is a set of pre-constitutional rules. It is in lieu of a formalized constitution and consists of accepted axiomatic policy. The constitution is similar to or developed from this. A metaconstitution is also less binding, and can be used to a less rigid form of government. To many nations, the metaconstitution provides an "exit-option", where they may variate from the written document. A metaconstitution, unlike formal constitutions, never needs to be written. Its creation results from the morality and judgment of the people. To be formulated, the people must be generally opposed to anarchy and must desire some form of governing force.

Although vague in concept, the metaconstitution almost always creates the basic roles of leader v. follower. The purpose of the document, however, prevents the placement of total power on the leader. The populace is trusted to self-govern except in severe cases. Such theory does not differ much from salutary neglect or laissez faire.

Historical concept
Many prominent political philosophers have discoursed on the subject of metaconstitutionalism, though not directly. Some address the topic as a looser constitution in which the government's singular duty is to protect the people and vice versa. Per Alexis de Tocqueville: 

The concept of metaconstitutionalism received light during the Constitutional Convention, as a possible replacement to the Articles of Confederation. Per the Federalist, Number 51:

Metaconstitutions

Criticisms
A metaconstitution is constructed to provide a looser equivalent for government. However, a metaconstitutionalistic society is more likely to suffer from domestic disorder. This is because the government cannot wield any power to control the outbreak. Lack of trade and corruption are also major difficulties for a metaconstitution. Again, the governments legal inability to enforce powerful law prevents it from containing situations. In this usage of "metaconstitution", it can also mean a constitution with a nearly non-existent executive branch.

See also
The Federalist Papers
Alexis de Tocqueville
Constitutionalism
Constitutional economics
Rule according to higher law

References

External links
Full text of the Federalist, Number 51

Legal history
Constitutional law
Philosophy of law